Chrysoethia mimentis is located in Animalia and comes in the class of Insecta. Chhrysoethia mimnetis(also known as C.mimentis) belongs to the family of Gelechiidae. Its genus is Chrysoesthia. Its phylum is Arthropoda and the order is Lepidoptera. Its binomial name is Chrysoesthia mimentis.

References

Endemic moths of South Africa
Moths described in 1963
Chrysoesthia